Vaibhav Global Limited (VGL), formerly known as Vaibhav Gems, is a multi-national electronic retailer and manufacturer of fashion jewelry and lifestyle accessories. It sells its products through its home shopping channels, Shop LC in the United States and TJC in the United Kingdom. The company is headquartered in Jaipur, India.

History 
VGL was founded as Vaibhav Enterprises in 1980. It was later incorporated as Vaibhav Gems Limited, in 1989 at Jaipur, India. The company became Vaibhav Global Limited in 1994 and went public in 1996-97. VGL continued expanding its manufacturing and retail capabilities and in 2005-06 acquired STS Group of companies.

During the recession of 2008-09, the purchasing power of US consumers dropped significantly and VGL had to rework its strategy. The company brought the average price of its products down to $18 - $20 from $100 per piece in 2010 thereby, successfully transitioning from store-based jewelry business to discount retail business through web and TV channels.

It has electronic retail units: Shop LC formerly Liquidation Channel in the US & Canada and TJC formally The Jewellery Channel in UK & Ireland. These are wholly owned TV channels as well as e-commerce platforms. The combined reach of these two TV channels is about 123 million households.

Awards and recognition 

 Vaibhav Global conferred 'Best Governed Company' At 20th edition of ICSI National Awards for Excellence in Corporate Governance 

 VGL was ranked 234th in Fortune India's Next 500 list of India's largest mid-sized companies by revenue in the year 2013-14.

 It also ranked 3rd amongst India's top 50 wealth creators list by Fortune India magazine.

 The company was awarded the Indian Gem and Jewellery Award 2015 for silver jewelry and also for Most Socially Responsible Company.

See also 

TJC (TV channel)
Shop LC
ShopLC Germany

References

External links 
 

Online retailers of India
Retail companies of India
Companies listed on the National Stock Exchange of India
Companies listed on the Bombay Stock Exchange